Thomas Fitzwilliam (died 1497) was Speaker of the House of Commons of England.

Thomas Fitzwilliam may also refer to:

Thomas Arthur Fitzwilliam, Irish physician
Thomas FitzWilliam, 1st Viscount FitzWilliam (1581–1650), Viscount FitzWilliam
Thomas FitzWilliam, 4th Viscount FitzWilliam (died 1704), Viscount FitzWilliam
Thomas FitzWilliam, 9th Viscount FitzWilliam, Viscount FitzWilliam

See also
Fitzwilliam (disambiguation)